Spectral band replication (SBR) is a technology to enhance audio or speech codecs, especially at low bit rates and is based on harmonic redundancy in the frequency domain.

It can be combined with any audio compression codec: the codec itself transmits the lower and midfrequencies of the spectrum, while SBR replicates higher frequency content by transposing up harmonics from the lower and midfrequencies at the decoder. Some guidance information for reconstruction of the high-frequency spectral envelope is transmitted as side information.

When needed, it also reconstructs or adaptively mixes in noise-like information in selected frequency bands in order to faithfully replicate signals that originally contained no or fewer tonal components.

The SBR idea is based on the principle that the psychoacoustic part of the human brain tends to analyse higher frequencies with less accuracy; thus harmonic phenomena associated with the spectral band replication process needs only be accurate in a perceptual sense and not technically or mathematically exact.

History and use 
A Swedish company Coding Technologies (acquired by Dolby in 2007) developed and pioneered the use of SBR in its MPEG-2 AAC-derived codec called aacPlus, which first appeared in 2001. This codec was submitted to MPEG and formed the basis of MPEG-4 High-Efficiency AAC (HE-AAC), standardized in 2003. Lars Liljeryd, Kristofer Kjörling, and Martin Dietz received the IEEE Masaru Ibuka Consumer Electronics Award in 2013 for their work developing and marketing HE-AAC. Coding Technologies' SBR method has also been used with WMA 10 Professional to create WMA 10 Pro LBR, and with MP3 to create mp3PRO.

It is used in broadcast systems like DAB+, Digital Radio Mondiale (both DRM+ and DRM), HD Radio, and XM Satellite Radio.

If the player is not capable of using the side information that has been transmitted alongside the "normal" compressed audio data, it may still be able to play the "baseband" data as usual, resulting in a dull (since the high frequencies are missing), but otherwise mostly acceptable sound. This is, for example, the case if an mp3PRO file is played back with MP3 software incapable of utilizing the SBR information.

See also 
 MPEG-4 Part 3
 Psychoacoustics
 Spectral bands

External links 
  Coding Technologies page describing SBR, as it appeared in 2007 at the Dolby acquisition

References 

Audio codecs